Herbert Dischinger founded a subsidiary of Sortimo Grundstücks- and Beteiligungs-GmbH (Property and Participation GmbH), Sortimo International GmbH in 1973. The name Sortimo stands for  "SORTIment MObil" (meaning mobile assortment). The company has 500 employees in Germany. Sortimo develops and manufactures in-vehicle equipment for various trades, industries and the automotive industry. Headquarters are in Zusmarshausen, Bavaria.

The modular structure of the equipment makes it possible to equip almost any commercial vehicle. Products are exported from the Zusmarshausen production site throughout the world.

History
In 1973 Herbert Dischinger developed a metal case for the safe transport of parts and tools – its dimensions soon became the industry standard. Following the building block principle one product fits the other: boxes into the cases and the cases in the in-vehicle equipment. The first production site in Biburg near Diedorf saw products such as the Rolliboy, tool cases, components cases and case cabinets. In 1980 Sortimo began to produce its own products instead of by sub-contract manufacture under license. Ten years later Sortimo International Ausrüstungssysteme für Servicefahrzeuge GmbH, equipment systems for service vehicles, was founded. In 1992 all production sites were centralised at the new plant in Zusmarshausen and a wide variety of new products were included in the production programme.  Zusmarshausen continues to be the central production site. In 1994 Sortimo was the first in the industry to have its quality management certified in accordance with DIN EN ISO 9001. All products carry the TÜV seal for proven quality. Construction for the new logistics centre in Zusmarshausen started in the spring of 2008.

Products

In 2004 Sortimo introduced the third generation of in-vehicle equipment, "Sortimo Globelyst". The current Globelyst range includes more than 1400 components, approximately 600 floor inserts and wall claddings. With the introduction of the T-Boxx in 2007, Sortimo offers an alternative to the classic small components case also known as "KM 321".

Sortimo Speedwave
Sortimo Speedwave, a subsidiary of the Sortimo Grundstücks- und Beteiligungs-GmbH was founded in 2000. Sortimo Speedwave is a certified (VDA 6.1 and ISO 9001) development partner and system supplier. Its core competences are with multifunctional interior vehicle products, cargo management, loading room systems and sidewall claddings. Speedwave designs and develops individual and complete solutions throughout a closed processing chain. Interdisciplinary cooperation, the integration of modern simulation technologies and an extensive project and processing management distinguish the work of the company.

Company structure
In addition to its headquarters in the Bavarian town of Zusmarshausen, Sortimo supports an extensive sales network throughout Germany. It offers nine Sortimo branch offices and thirty authorised partner stations. Worldwide export activities include Australia, Argentina, Belgium, China, Denmark, Finland, France, Greece, the United Kingdom, Iceland, Israel, Italy, Japan, Canada, Korea, Lithuania, Luxembourg, Mexico, the Netherlands, Norway, Austria, Poland, Portugal, Russia, Sweden, Switzerland, Slovakia, Slovenia, Spain, the Czech Republic, Hungary, the United States, Venezuela and Cyprus.

Safety
30 years of joint crash testing with the German ADAC, DEKRA, TRL, TÜV and UTAC guarantee the safety of the equipment. All crash tests under live conditions have been passed with flying colours.

The environment
Sortimo in-vehicle equipment is made of 100% of recyclable materials such as aluminium, steel or high-quality plastics. Light weight construction with the Sortimo aluminium SpaceFrame architecture guarantees both, stability and low weight. Plastic boxes and cases reduce the net weight of the equipment, which means that the vehicle uses less petrol and thus adds to the protection of the environment.

Sponsoring
A 10-year-old tradition in the house of Sortimo was the financial support of the Augsburger Tafel as well a cash and gifts in kind for the health and advise centre in Zusmarshausen. Company founder Herbert Dischinger supported the medical centre Augsburg foundation. After years of sponsoring cultural events in Dresden and Munich, Sortimo ranks among the exclusive partners of the FC Augsburg since 2007.

References

External links
 The website for Sortimo International GmbH
 The website for Sortimo Speedwave GmbH

Auto parts suppliers of Germany
Companies based in Bavaria
Manufacturing companies established in 1973
Storage systems
1973 establishments in West Germany
Tool manufacturing companies of Germany